Bernie Brady (born 31 August 1947) is a former Australian rules footballer who played one game for the Collingwood Football Club in the Victorian Football League (VFL) in 1968.

Notes

External links 

1947 births
Australian rules footballers from Victoria (Australia)
Collingwood Football Club players
Living people